At state level, Bosnia and Herzegovina votes for the rotating Presidency of Bosnia and Herzegovina and the Parliamentary Assembly. President is elected for a four-year term by constituencies referring to the three main ethnic groups. The candidate with the most votes in a constituency is elected. The Parliamentary Assembly (Parlamentarna Skupština) has two chambers. The House of Representatives (Predstavnički dom/Zastupnički dom) has 42 members, elected for a four-year term by proportional representation in each main ethnic group. The House of Peoples (Dom Naroda) has 15 members, appointed by the parliaments of the two Entities. Bosnia and Herzegovina has a multi-party system, with numerous political parties in which no one party has a chance of gaining power alone, and parties must work with each other to form coalition governments. Each main ethnic group has its own dominant political party.

Schedule

Election

Latest elections

2018 presidential elections

2018 parliamentary assembly

See also
 Electoral calendar
 Electoral system
 Central Election Commission of Bosnia and Herzegovina, administrative body responsible for regulating and supervising Elections in Bosnia and Herzegovina

References

External links
Adam Carr's Election Archive
Parties and Elections in Europe

 
Central Election Commission of Bosnia and Herzegovina